A Hot Night in Paris is the only album by the Phil Collins Big Band, released in 1999 by Atlantic Records.  Fronted by Genesis lead singer/drummer Phil Collins, the album did not contain any singing.  Instead, the album consisted of big band renditions of primarily Collins and Genesis songs, with Collins remaining at the drums.

The album did not chart on the Billboard 200, although it did reach No. 3 on the jazz album chart.

Track listing
"Sussudio" – 6:52 (Phil Collins)
"That's All" – 5:34 (Tony Banks/Collins/Mike Rutherford)
"Invisible Touch" – 5:42 (Banks/Collins/Rutherford)
"Hold on My Heart" – 6:36 (Banks/Collins/Rutherford)
"Chips & Salsa" – 5:23 (Gerald Albright) 
"I Don't Care Anymore" – 6:05 (Collins)
"Milestones" – 6:34 (Miles Davis)
"Against All Odds (Take a Look at Me Now)" – 5:04 (Collins)
"Pick Up the Pieces" – 12:41 (Roger Ball/Hamish Stuart/Average White Band)
"The Los Endos Suite" – 10:25 (Banks/Collins/Steve Hackett/Rutherford)

On the 2019 remaster, "Hold on My Heart" and "Chips & Salsa" swapped order.

Personnel

Musicians

Saxophones
Matt James (alto), Gerald Albright (alto), Chris Collins (tenor), Larry Panella (tenor), Ian Nevins (tenor), Kevin Sheehan (baritone)
Trombones:
Arturo Velasco, Scott Bliege, Mark Bettcher, Antonio García
Trumpets:
Dan Fornero, Harry Kim, Tito Carillo, Al Hood, Ron Modell 	
Rhythm section:
Daryl Stuermer (guitar), Brad Cole (piano, keyboards), George Duke (piano on "Pick up the Pieces"), Doug Richeson (bass), Luis Conte (percussion), Phil Collins (drums, band leader)

Technical
Don Murray – producer, mixing, mastering
Daryl Stuermer – producer
Phil Collins – oversaw production
Pete Doell – assistant engineer
Dann Thompson – assistant engineer
Greg Burns – assistant engineer
Mauricio Guerrero – live recording engineer
Christophe Suchet – live recording engineer
Dinemec Mobile Studio – recording
Robert Vosgien – mastering
Wherefore Art? – cover design
Sian Rance – illustration

Acknowledgements
"It was 1966 when I first heard the Buddy Rich Swinging New Big Band. All the other things I was listening to at the time had to move over and make room for this wonderful noise I had discovered. I went searching for more and discovered Count Basie with Sonny Payne, Harold Jones and Jo Jones... then Duke Ellington and so many more. I decided that, one day, I'd have to have a go myself and form my own big band.

Thirty years later I did it. In 1996 I toured Europe with Quincy Jones conducting and Tony Bennett as our guest vocalist and my band. I was in Heaven.

Having dived in, I couldn't wait to do it again. In 1998 I took the band out again and toured the United States and Europe. We recorded some shows and the result is here to listen to. For me it's a labour of love. I'm back where I belong, behind the drums, playing music I'm proud of with some wonderful musicians. I hope it moves you as it does me. If it does, come and see us sometime."

Luv

Phil Collins

Chart performance

Reception
AllMusic 
Q

References

External links
The Official Phil Collins Website

1999 debut albums
1999 live albums
The Phil Collins Big Band live albums
Atlantic Records live albums
Albums produced by Daryl Stuermer